The Little Rascals is a 30-minute Saturday morning animated series produced by Hanna-Barbera Productions and King World Productions. It first aired on ABC on September 25, 1982. A spin-off based on the live-action Our Gang comedy shorts, it was broadcast as part of The Pac-Man/Little Rascals/Richie Rich Show in 1982 and then as part of The Monchhichis/Little Rascals/Richie Rich Show in 1983.

The characters were designed by Iwao Takamoto and Bob Singer by using tracing paper on top of actual photographs of the real-life characters, and used a pencil to sketch the characters.  The same technique was also used in previous Hanna-Barbera spin-offs such as The Fonz and the Happy Days Gang and Laverne and Shirley in the Army.

Overview

Previous Little Rascals/Our Gang animated television programs 
The Little Rascals had been animated for television twice before. In the 1960s, a series of nine clay-animated Little Rascals Color Specials were produced for syndication, presumably by Bura & Hardwick, the British studio responsible for Camberwick Green, using soundtracks from the original Our Gang films. The episodes include "Shiver My Timbers", "Our Gang Follies of 1936", "Second Childhood", "Hearts Are Thumps", "Came the Brawn", "Bear Shooters", "Readin' and Writin'", "The Pinch Singer", and "Teacher's Beau". 

In 1979, Fred Wolf produced an animated The Little Rascals Christmas Special for NBC. That company's version was further used in animated public service announcements.

Differences between the animated series and the live-action Our Gang films 
The animated series and the original live-action Our Gang films differ in a number of ways. The gang now lives in a contemporary 1980s setting, with computers and television. Buckwheat is now a clever inventor and is interested in science, always creating new devices for the gang, and Darla's eyes were changed from hazel to blue (although this detail was trivial given that all of the Our Gang shorts were in black-and-white). Also in the animated series, the Rascals met in a treehouse and drove around the town of Greenpoint in a dog-drawn vehicle. Also, the theme music was completely different. Furthermore, many characters such as Stymie don't appear.

Lawsuit 
In March 1984, Our Gang actor Eugene Lee, who had played Porky in the original theatrical short films as a child from 1935 to 1939, sued Hanna-Barbera Productions for nearly $2 million, claiming that the animated character was a violation of his likeness rights. He was joined in the lawsuit by other former Our Gang kids: George McFarland, who had played Spanky, Tommy Bond, who had played Butch, and Sidney Kibrick, who had played The Woim. Carl Switzer, Darla Hood and Billie Thomas, who had played Alfalfa, Darla and Buckwheat respectively were already deceased. It was found that Hanna-Barbera's license from King World did not include the likeness rights of the former child actors, and the case was settled out of court.

Other languages 
The French dub for Antenne 2, Les Petites Canailles, replaced the original theme music with a new theme song, performed by a chorus of children over a montage of clips from both the theatrical Our Gang shorts and the animated shorts.

Episode titles

Season 1 (1982) 
Aired as part of The Pac-Man/Little Rascals/Richie Rich Show

Season 2 (1983) 
Aired as part of The Monchhichis/Little Rascals/Richie Rich Show

"Tiny Terror", "Class Act", "Porky-O and Julie-Et" and "Cap'n Spanky's Showboat", previously aired during the first season, were rebroadcast on October 8 and 22, and November 5 and 26, 1983 respectively.

Cast

Main voices 
 Peter Cullen as Pete the Pup and Officer Ed
 Patty Maloney as Darla Hood
 Julie McWhirter as Alfalfa, Porky, and The Woim
 Scott Menville as Spanky
 Shavar Ross as Buckwheat
 B.J. Ward as Butch and Waldo

Additional voices 

 Richard Balin
 Jered Barclay
 Julie Bennett
 Susan Blu
 Bill Callaway
 Brian Cummings
 Jeff Doucette
 Peggy Frees
 Phil Hartman
 Ery Immerman
 Kip King
 Earl Kress
 Sherry Lynn
 Larry D. Mann
 Kenneth Mars
 Joe Medalis
 Robert Ridgely
 Michael Sheehan
 Gary Stamm
 Jeffrey Tambor
 Russi Taylor
 Lennie Weinrib
 Jimmy Weldon
 Frank Welker
 Ted Zeigler

Home media 
It was announced on Facebook on April 23, 2016 that the series will not be released on DVD due to reasons beyond Warner Archive's control.

References

External links 
 
 The Little Rascals at BCDB

1980s American animated television series
1982 American television series debuts
1983 American television series endings
American animated television spin-offs
American Broadcasting Company original programming
American children's animated comedy television series
Animated television series about children
Animation based on real people
English-language television shows
Our Gang
Television series by King World Productions
Television series by Hanna-Barbera
Television articles with disputed naming style